Mem Vayasuku Vacham is a 2012 Telugu-language film directed by Trinadha Rao Nakkina & produced by Gopalrao and Kedari Lakshman. The film stars Tanish and Niti Taylor.

Synopsis 
When Lucky meets Dil, he has no way of knowing that he would fall in love with her. When he knows that she is engaged to another man he realises his love for her. He expresses his feelings but she keeps him away. Then she realize that she is also in love, however fate is determined to keep the two apart, as Dil is set to marry another man.

Cast 
Tanish as Lakshman "Lucky"
Niti Taylor as Dilruba Begum "Dil"
 Madalasa Sharma as Kushi
K. Bhagyaraja as Subramanyam from Chennai
Mahaboob Basha as Ismail
Rama Prabha as Dil's grandmother
Y. Kasi Viswanath as Lucky's father
Snigdha as SMS Shyamala
Surya as Dil's father
Sana as Dil's mother
Raksha as Lucky's mother
Dhanraj as Beggar
Thagubothu Ramesh as Beggar
Chammak Chandra as Beggar

Soundtrack

Reception 
IndiaGlitz reviewed the movie, calling it a "sublime love story that is a splendid watch". The Times of India rated it at three stars, citing that the movie's romance and music stood out as highlights.

References

2012 films
2010s Telugu-language films
Films directed by Trinadha Rao Nakkina